Mohammad Salim Al-Awa (born December 22, 1942) is an Egyptian Islamist thinker, widely considered to belong to the moderate Islamic democratic strain. He is the former Secretary General of the International Union for Muslim Scholars based in London, and head of the Egyptian Association for Culture and Dialogue. Al-Awa has been called one of the few Islamic thinkers who has made a "serious attempt" at "defining what Islamism would mean in a modern society," or "courageously delved into the realities of Islamic history and experimented with new interpretations."

His allegations that the Coptic Orthodox Church was storing weapons in churches and monasteries worsened anti-Christian sentiment in Egypt, contributing to the 2011 Alexandria bombing which killed 23 people and injured another 97.

On 14 June 2011, Al-Awa declared his candidacy for the 2012 Egyptian presidential election in September of that year.

References

External links 
 
 iumsonline.net
 "Mohamed Selim El-Awa:  Political thought, activism, and the spaces between; Faith in the struggle; Profile by Omayma Abdel-Latif", Al Ahram Weekly, 30 October - 5 November 2003, Issue No. 662

Living people
1942 births
Egyptian Islamists
Egyptian writers
Members of the Egyptian Constituent Assembly of 2012
International Union of Muslim Scholars members